Mario Rašić (born 20 May 1989) is a Croatian professional footballer who plays as a forward for Bistra.

He had spells with several clubs in Austria.

References

External links
 

1989 births
Living people
Footballers from Zagreb
Association football forwards
Croatian footballers
NK Inter Zaprešić players
NK Vrapče players
NK Hrvatski Dragovoljac players
SC-ESV Parndorf 1919 players
Neftochimic Burgas players
HNK Gorica players
SV Stegersbach players
NK Bistra players
Croatian Football League players
First Football League (Croatia) players
First Professional Football League (Bulgaria) players
Austrian Regionalliga players
Austrian Landesliga players
Austrian 2. Landesliga players
Croatian expatriate footballers
Expatriate footballers in Austria
Croatian expatriate sportspeople in Austria
Expatriate footballers in Bulgaria
Croatian expatriate sportspeople in Bulgaria